Sidwaya is a French-language newspaper in Burkina Faso. It was founded in 1984 following the Thomas Sankara government's closure of the independent Observateur. Among the printed media of Burkina Faso its circulation is second to the reopened L'Observateur Paalga, and Sidwaya is still associated with the government view.

References

External links
 Newspaper homepage (French)

Newspapers published in Burkina Faso
French-language newspapers published in Africa
Publications established in 1984